Boliviana de Aviación is the flag carrier of the Plurinational State of Bolivia. Its main hub is Jorge Wilstermann International Airport in Cochabamba from where it currently serves a network of 9 domestic and 2 international destinations.  However, it also serves several domestic and all international destinations out of Viru Viru International Airport in Santa Cruz de la Sierra, including long-haul services to Miami and Madrid.

Destinations

The list includes the city, country, the codes of the International Air Transport Association (IATA airport code) and the International Civil Aviation Organization (ICAO airport code), and the airport's name, with the airline's hubs marked.  It also includes future destinations planned by the airline as well as a separate block for seasonal or special/charter service destinations it may have served in the past.

References

Lists of airline destinations